Lore de Angeles (1951-) is an author, psychic and knowledge holder. Of Briton, Alban, Gaeilge and Breizh heritage, de Angeles' ancestry is a direct line to Caradoc (Caratacus) ap Cunobelinus. They are the author of over 15 books on subjects ranging from Priteni lore and curation (see Annals of Tacitus), to witchcraft, poetry, mysticism and speculative fiction. They are an author and film-maker, writing and directing both stage/street productions and short film.

De Angeles was sold under a church and state policy of the clean break closed adoption practices, rescinded in recent years as a result of Prime Minister Julia Gillard's National Apology For Forced Adoptions of 2013, and the admission of the Catholic Church for the same violation.

Career 
De Angeles' first child was born in 1972 and, with no known government assistance for a single parent they became involved, within a year, with the fledgling computer industry in Sydney and, through her work with Harper & Row she met author and editor Nevill Drury, who was to launch her career as an author several years later. By 1979 de Angeles was running a coven of several people, reading tarot full-time and had begun public teaching and lectures relating to her magical practice and mysticism, specifically at the New Awareness Centre, and the inaugural Mind, Body and Spirit Festival in a shamanic-style workshop that included Nevill Drury. Ly wrote several articles for Nexus Magazine and their first book, The Way of the Goddess, was published through Unity/Prism, UK, in 1987. This was followed, in 1991, by The Way of Merlyn. Both books were imprints of Drury's own niche publishing company, Prism, in Dorset, England. Both titles were published under another surname. De Angeles had her last name changed legally, whilst continuing to seek her true identity, in 1997. They began to gain answers to blood family, through PARC, in 2001.

Writing and production 
For several years de Angeles has facilitated public gatherings, called Rivers in the Skin, both nationally and internationally, based on their book Priteni.

Awards 
 COVR Visionary Fiction Award, The Quickening, U.S.A., 2003
 Byron All Shorts, The Redemption of Joe Frame, Australia, 2009
 Short-listed Byron International Film Festival, The Redemption of Joe Frame, Australia, 2009
 Short-listed Byron International Film Festival, The Redemption of Joe Frame, Australia, 2010
 gritLIT, Comeuppance, Canada, 2016

Personal life 
Learning of a true ancestry, via both DNA testing and extensive genealogical research through A Family Tree, from 2000 onwards, until their adoption discharge in the NSW High Court in 2020, de Angeles has been a staunch defender of the heritage of those conquered and disenfranchised, particularly peoples of the 7 Celtic Nations, since the invasion and subjugation of indigenous islanders under Rome.

Bibliography 
 The Way of the Goddess, 1987
 The Way of Merlyn, 1991
 Witchcraft Theory and Practice, 2000
 When I See the Wild God, 2004
 Pagan Visions for a Sustainable Future, 2005 (with Thom van Dooren and Emma Restall-Orr)
 The Quickening, 1st in the Traveler Series, 2005
 The Shining Isle, 2nd in the Traveler Series, 2006
 Tarot Theory and Practice, 2007
 Magdalene, the Witch of the Grail Legends, 2012
 Genesis, the Future, 2012. Revised and Expanded 2019
 Body Language, Fitness and Nutrition, 2013
 The Feast of Flesh and Spirit, 2015
 Priteni, the Decimation of the Celtic Britons, 2015
 Comeuppance, The Crime Factory, Issue 15, 2016 (short story)
 Initiation, a Memoir, 2016
 The Skellig, with Melaine Knight, 2017
 Witch, For Those Who Are, 2019
 Under Snow, 3rd in the Traveler Series, with Serenity de Angeles, 2019
 Advanced Tarot, the Voyage of Prophecy, 2020

Filmography 
 Healers, Quacks or Mystics? (1983) ABC TV Series
 The Redemption of Joe Frame, a Rushton/de Angeles production, 2009
 Wings, black comedy, Full Story Productions, 2010

References

External links 
 https://www.lydeangeles.com/
 http://covr.org/
 https://web.archive.org/web/20131126161130/https://www.createspace.com/
 http://www.thecrimefactory.com/
 https://www.imdb.com/title/tt1521075/
 http://www.fullstoryproductions.net
 http://flickerfest.com.au/
 http://www.bbff.com.au/

Australian writers
Living people
1951 births
Writers from Sydney
Australian filmmakers